The World's Strongest Man 2009 was the 32nd edition of World's Strongest Man and took place in Valletta, Malta from 26 September to 3 October 2009. It was sponsored by PartyPoker.com. It was anticipated by the strength athletics world as promising to be "the best one yet." The anticipation was based on the organisers ensuring invites were made to "every top athlete in the world" regardless of their affiliation to any particular strength athletics body. In previous years, the schism between the International Federation of Strength Athletes and the organisers of WSM had meant that certain athletes were forbidden to compete, undermining the credentials of the competition.

Qualifying
The official qualifying competition for the 2009 WSM was the newly created Giants Live tour. This had taken the place of the World's Strongest Man Super Series, although the latter continued to run with a separate pool of athletes. However, the weakening of the IFSA, due to the economic pressures affecting the whole of the strength athletics world at this time, had led to the breaking down of barriers between the various concurrent circuits. Strength athletes were able to compete in more than one circuit and did so, with a cross over of athletes between the Giants Live circuit, the Strongman Champions League and the Strongman Super Series. In an interview with Ironmind, a source close to the WSM decision makers said, "World’s Strongest Man has never stopped the world’s best strongmen from going to WSM and now that the world of strongman is getting much closer, it appears that we will be able to have every top athlete in the world there [this year]." This led to Ironmind stating that the World’s Strongest Man 2009 promises to be the best one yet. Such is the status of WSM that Ironmind also stated that "If you are a leading strongman competitor, or want to be recognized as one, the most important thing at this point is to get an invitation to the 2009 World’s Strongest Man contest."

This ethos led to a mixture of qualifying criteria applied. Mariusz Pudzianowski qualified, by virtue of being the defending WSM champion. A further eight competitors were selected based on their showing on Giants Live (Brian Shaw; Derek Poundstone; Travis Ortmayer; Mikhail Koklyaev (injured so did not compete); Richard Skog; Mark Felix; Jarek Dymek; and Stefan Solvi Petursson). In addition “the top five from Strongman Champions League were taken into account”, in a deal struck with the relatively new organisation which had already made deals with such high profile tournaments as Fortissimus. The IMG committee also developed a list of wild card invitations. This gave them the flexibility to invite the very top athletes in the world who were not part of the official qualifying tour, or subsequent agreements with other bodies. Through this avenue the great Zydrunas Savickas, six time winner of the Arnold's Strongest Man, IFSA World Champion, and Fortissimus winner, deemed by many as the strongest man in the world in terms of his ability to lift massive weights, was invited. Also, those who performed well in the revamped Strongman Super Series also received invites as well as podium finishers in certain one off events.

Competitors
The 2009 WSM line-up was widely agreed to have been one of, if not the best ever. Every major federation and Strongman competition was represented. Among those competing were the current and 5-time World's Strongest Man, Mariusz Pudzianowski (also the last man to win the World Strongman Cup); 2-time IFSA World Champion and reigning Fortissimus champion Zydrunas Savickas, titled the Strongest Man on the Planet, (also the Strongman Champions League winner); and that year's Arnold Strongman Classic champion, Derek Poundstone, (also the current Strongman Super Series overall champion). Additionally, a former World's Strongest Man, Phil Pfister, the Highlander World Champion Sebastian Wenta, the Rolling Thunder world champion, Mark Felix, and 15 current national champions and a former World Champion in the 105 kg class. So strong was the line-up that Tarmo Mitt, four times a WSM finalist, was only among the reserves. The competitors held, between them, at least 15 strongman world records.

Source:

Format
The 25 competitors were split into five separate heats, each consisting of six events. After each event each competitor was given points, from 5 for first to 1 for last. Half points occurred if more than one competitor has the same result, and no points were scored if a competitor did not take part in an event. The points were tallied after the six events and the two competitors with the most points from each heat progressed to the final. The final consisted of seven events and the champion was the competitor with the most points after all of the events.

The Head referee was Colin Bryce, assisted by Svend Karlsen (the 2001 World's Strongest Man). Jouko Ahola, World's Strongest Man winner from 1997 and 1999, was the equipment manager.

Events

There were a total of 15 different events used in the competition:

In the Group stages the a mixture of the following events were used:

Medley - Cannon ball & sledge (the event took place on the Valletta Waterfront)
Medley - Anchor & chain & barrels (the event took place on the Valletta Waterfront)
Truck Pull (the event took place on the Valletta Waterfront - all groups were involved)
Squat Lift (the event took place at the Grand Hotel Excelsior - groups one and four involved)
Dead Lift (the event took place at the Grand Hotel Excelsior - groups two, three and five involved)
Car Walk (the event took place at the Grand Hotel Excelsior - groups one, three and four involved)
Fingal's Fingers (the event took place on the Birgu Waterfront - groups two and five were involved)
Dumbbell Press (the event took place on the Birgu Waterfront - groups one and three were involved)
Keg Toss (the event took place at Golden Bay - groups two, four and five were involved)
Atlas Stones (the event took place at Golden Bay - all groups were involved)

In the final:

Fingal's Fingers (the event took place at Fort St Elmo)
Giant Farmer's Walk (the event took place at Fort St Elmo)
Plane Pull (limited public access)
Overhead Lift - Apollon's Axle (the event took place at Wied iz-Zurrieq)
Boat Pull (the event took place at Wied iz-Zurrieq)
Car Deadlift (the event took place at the Grand Hotel Excelsior)
Atlas Stones (the event took place at the Grand Hotel Excelsior)

Heats

Group 1

Group 2

Group 3

Group 4

Group 5

Final
Dates: 1, 2, 3 September 2009.
Results published at Official WSM site

Results

Television broadcast

United States
In the USA the event was broadcast on ESPN and ESPN2 in January 2010, on Thursday 7 January and Saturday 9 January, with some repeat screenings on Sunday 10, 17 and 24 January. Further screenings in late February and March are planned.

United Kingdom
In the UK Bravo obtained the rights to screen both The Giants Live Tour (the official qualifying tour for The World's Strongest Man) as well as the finals. Giants Live was shown on three consecutive days from Saturday 26 December 2009 to Monday 28 December. The finals were broadcast over six consecutive Mondays in early 2010 from 4 January to 8 February, with each episode dedicated to a qualifying group, and the sixth episode being the final. The UK broadcast was produced by IMG Media for Bravo and featured presenters Martin Bayfield and Zöe Salmon, with some guest presenters including Bill Kazmaier and Svend Karlsen. The commentators were Paul Dickenson and Colin J L Bryce and the outside broadcast was performed by 021 Television Ltd.

References

External links
 Official site

2009 in sports
World's Strongest Man